Cargo Plus Aviation was a cargo airline based in Dubai, United Arab Emirates. It operated ad hoc flights to Asia, Africa and eastern Europe.

History 
The airline was established in July 2001  and started operations in August 2001.

Services 

Cargo Plus Aviation operated freight services to the following international scheduled destinations (at January 2005): Kano, Khartoum, Lagos, Mumbai, Nairobi, N'Djamena and Sharjah.

Accidents and incidents 
In March 2005, a Boeing 707 operated by Cargo Plus Aviation on behalf of Ethiopian Airlines crashed in Lake Victoria. The plane crashed while making an emergency landing in Entebbe, Uganda, while en route from Addis Ababa to Lomé. Some people aboard sustained injuries and the plane was destroyed, but there were no fatalities.

Fleet 
The Cargo Plus Aviation fleet consisted of the following aircraft:

1 Boeing 707-320C
1 Douglas DC-8-63F

References

Defunct airlines of the United Arab Emirates
Airlines established in 2001
Cargo airlines of the United Arab Emirates
Emirati companies established in 2001